Tonnie Heijnen (born 3 June 1967) is a Dutch para table tennis player who competes in international level events. He is a Paralympic champion, World champion and six-time European medalist. He competes in team events alongside Gerben Last.

Personal life
In 2002, Heijnen was involved in a serious car accident while on holiday which resulted in a leg injury. He lost part of his right leg in the accident below his knee.

In 2010, two weeks after winning the World team class 9 title, he collapsed at home with pulmonary embolism, he spent three weeks in hospital and made a full recovery.

References

1967 births
Living people
Medalists at the 2004 Summer Paralympics
Paralympic table tennis players of the Netherlands
People from Hoogeveen
Sportspeople from Emmen, Netherlands
Table tennis players at the 2004 Summer Paralympics
Table tennis players at the 2008 Summer Paralympics
Table tennis players at the 2012 Summer Paralympics
Dutch male table tennis players